Voluntary student unionism (VSU), as it is known in Australia, or voluntary student membership (VSM), as it is known in New Zealand, is a policy under which membership of – and payment of membership fees to – university student organisations is voluntary.

Australia passed legislation enacting VSU in 2005, which came into force on 1 July 2006. Forms of VSU in Australia had been law in the state of Western Australia from 1994 until 2002, and in Victoria from 1994 to 2000.

New Zealand passed legislation enacting VSM in 2011, rules which came into force on 1 January 2012.

Arguments and issues
Arguments for and against VSU typically fall into three broad categories: civil rights impacts, social impacts, and economic impacts.

The civil rights argument
Requiring membership of student organisations is seen by some as a form of forced unionisation, contrary to freedom of association. Alternatively it may be seen as being required to belong to a professional organisation, in which case it would merely be a means of ensuring standards.

Opponents of VSU argue that it silences students' voices by removing universal membership of a student organisation.

The social argument
A common thread in the argument against VSU is the notion of a campus culture, or the university experience. University has traditionally been a time of broadening horizons, socialising, and political activism. Opponents argue that VSU makes it more difficult for students to have high quality sports grounds, lively music and social venues, and the resources necessary to mount protests and political campaigns, leading to moribund campuses. This was a view expressed by Senator Barnaby Joyce. Proponents counter that the free-market system rewards venues and establishments which students enjoy and value, and that it lets students choose their own level of contribution to a political cause.

The economic argument
Student Unions charge anywhere between $0 and $300 per year for membership. Levying of fees is criticised by some on the grounds that it is financially onerous, particularly to students who may already be struggling with the associated costs of university study. Others cite that the associated financial benefits of robust representation provided by students' associations result in lower fees and higher quality of educational experience for students.

Australia

Australian student unionism before VSU 

Although universities and student unions each had their own rules, students generally were required to become a member of their campus student organisation automatically upon enrolment. A fee for student services or amenities was charged to students, typically once a semester, once a year, or in a lump sum upon enrolment. This fee was typically collected by the university, which usually took a portion in collection fees and passed the rest to campus student organisation(s). These organisations then distributed the money according to their own rules.

VSU legislation
On 9 December 2005, the Higher Education Support Amendment (Abolition of Compulsory Up-front Student Union Fees) Bill 2005 was passed in the Senate, and received the Royal Assent on 19 December 2005. Since 1 July 2006, Australian universities have faced fines of A$100 per student for compelling payment for any non-academic good or service.

Positions on VSU

Student unions
Many student organisations opposed VSU, expressing concern about their ability to provide social, academic, and political services under VSU as well as meet long-term financial commitments without guaranteed revenue streams.

Universities
Australian universities, as represented by the Australian Vice-Chancellors' Committee (AVCC), were generally in support of membership and compulsory fees for student organisations for three broad reasons. First, they prefer to leave service provision in the hands of students; second, the activities associated with campus organisations help to market the universities to prospective students; and third, they view student unions as valid representative bodies.

The Australian National University, the University of New South Wales, the University of Sydney, the University of Queensland, the University of Newcastle and the University of Adelaide have provided funding to their respective student unions, subject to various conditions.

History in Australia
Compulsory student organisation membership was initially accepted as uncontentious by all political persuasions. By the 1970s, the overtly political nature of the Australian Union of Students, which ran a number of overtly progressive campaigns (for example, in support of the Palestine Liberation Organization), led to a conservative minority within that organisation to call for voluntary student organisation membership.

Following its election in 1996, the Howard Government signalled its intention to introduce VSU. It tried to pass legislation to this effect several times in the late 1990s. Student organisations responded with strong campaigns in opposition to VSU throughout that time. The legislation was persistently rejected in the Australian Senate, where the Labor Party, the Australian Democrats, and the Greens have voted against it. Following its 2001 election victory, aware that attempts to introduce VSU would not pass the Senate, the Government moved away from the VSU agenda. Advocates of VSU received a boost, however, when the Howard government gained control of the Senate at the 2004 Federal election. Nationwide implementation of VSU had been listed among the government's legislative agenda to be placed before the Senate.

On 16 March 2005, Brendan Nelson introduced the Higher Education Support Amendment (Abolition of Compulsory Up-front Student Union Fees) Bill 2005 before the Parliament. Despite opposition, Education Minister Nelson insisted that the legislation would pass unamended and come into force as of 1 January 2006. By October 2005, however, it became apparent that it would not be possible to implement VSU in time for the new academic year.

On 9 December 2005, the legislation was reintroduced. Due to the decision of Joyce to cross the floor and vote against the legislation, Howard was forced to obtain the vote of Family First Senator Steve Fielding, who had maintained for several months that he was opposed to the bill in its current form. However, after being courted by Howard, Fielding did an abrupt about-face and voted for the legislation, calling compulsory student unionism "crazy" and allowing the bill to pass; though both Fielding and Brendan Nelson insisted no behind-the-scenes deal had secured his vote. The legislation was essentially identical to the government's original proposal.

In September 2010 the Gillard Labor government introduced legislation to allow universities to charge students a compulsory service fee of up to $250 a year to fund amenities such as sporting facilities, childcare and counselling.

New Zealand

Referendum based opt-out provisions
Under legislation passed in 1999, but subsequently superseded, VSM could be enacted at any New Zealand university by a referendum of students. Only students at the University of Auckland voted to enact VSM, affecting membership of the Auckland University Students' Association. Consequently, students enrolled since that vote go without membership in the student association unless they become aware of it, find out how to join, and afford the fees without the option of having it included in their student loan. Students at the University of Waikato enacted VSM, but later returned to universal student membership, when a referendum was held during study week.

Voluntary student membership
In October 2009, Heather Roy's Education (Freedom of Association) Amendment Bill was drawn from the ballot. The bill was greatly delayed due to a large number of public submissions (4837 in total, including 132 oral submissions), necessitating the Select Committee stage to be extended from the normal six months to a full year. It was later delayed due to filibustering by the Labour Party and of particular note, Trevor Mallard, of a bill ahead of it on the Order Paper – the aim was to push the debate out so the third reading could not occur before the 2011 election, causing the bill to die as Roy was not seeking re-election. However, the bill eventually passed its third reading on 28 September 2011, 63 votes in favour to 58 opposed. All student associations in New Zealand are now voluntary.

Terminology
There are several terms being used to describe voluntary student unionism and its opposite, each with its own frequency, accuracy, impartiality, and favourability.

Voluntary arrangements
 Voluntary student unionism (VSU)
 Anti-student organisation legislation (ASOL)
 Voluntary student representation (VSR) – A "watered down" alternative to VSU, in which compulsory fees for student politics are banned, but may still be levied for non-political uses.
 Voluntary student membership (VSM) – New Zealand arrangement similar to VSU
 Optional membership of student organisations (OMSO) – positive euphemism for VSU.

Universal arrangements
 Universal student unionism
 Universal student representation
 Student organisation
 Opt-out student membership
 Compulsory student unionism

References

External links
 Higher Education Support Amendment (Abolition of Compulsory Up-front Student Union Fees) Bill 2005
 Senate Report

News articles 
 Family First vote gets VSU through Senate (ABC News)
 Members Only (Sydney Morning Herald)
 Labor slams uni change as ideology gone mad (ABC News)
 Student union bill in peril as Nats defy PM
 Anti-VSU protesters hit parliament (Sydney Morning Herald)
 Unis need to prove VSU impact (Sydney Morning Herald)
 VSU prompted office attack: Fielding (ABC News)
 Fielding target of student protests (The Age)
  Protesters target Vic MP's office (The Age)

Anti-VSU links 
 Stop VSU (Melbourne University Student Union)
 UNSW College of Fine Arts on VSU

Pro-VSU links 
 The NUS versus Freedom of Association – Quadrant Magazine
 StudentChoice (New Zealand)

Students' unions in Australia
Students' unions
Student politics
Howard Government